The Veterans Memorial Bridge is a girder bridge connecting the North Side and South Side neighborhoods of Oil City, Pennsylvania. Built in 1990, the bridge was one of several similar structures constructed during a decade that saw major replacements of Upper Allegheny crossings; an original truss bridge on the site dated to the 1910s. The bridge, which features one northbound and two southbound lanes, is significantly longer than others along this stretch of river. This is mainly due to its crossing of a riverfront park on the Oil City shores.

See also
List of crossings of the Allegheny River

References
Nat'l Bridges

Bridges over the Allegheny River
Monuments and memorials in Pennsylvania
Bridges completed in 1990
Bridges in Venango County, Pennsylvania
Road bridges in Pennsylvania
Girder bridges in the United States
1990 establishments in Pennsylvania